Mouloudia Club El Bayadh, known as MC El Bayadh  or simply MCEB for short, is an Algerian football club based in El Bayadh. The club was founded in 1936 and its colours are white and blue. Their home stadium, [ Stadium]], has a capacity of 15,000 spectators. The club is currently playing in the Algerian Ligue Professionnelle 1.

History 
On June 30, 2021, MC El Bayadh promoted to the Algerian Ligue 2.

On May 21, 2022, MC El Bayadh promoted to the Algerian Ligue Professionnelle 1.

Players

Algerian teams are limited to two foreign players. The squad list includes only the principal nationality of each player;

Current squad
As of 5 February 2023.

Personnel

Current technical staff

References

External links 

1936 establishments in Algeria
Association football clubs established in 1936
Football clubs in Algeria
Algerian Ligue Professionnelle 1 clubs